Elattoneura souteri is a damselfly species in the family Platycnemididae. It is endemic to Western Ghats in India.

Description and habitat
It is a medium sized damselfly with reddish-brown eyes, pale greenish beneath. Its thorax is velvet-black, marked with a broad cherry-red humeral stripe. There is another lateral stripe of citron-yellow in the first lateral suture and cherry-red in anterior follows it. The hinder half of the metepimeron is yellow. Its abdomen is black with red and yellow marks.

It is found on the banks of submontane streams in Western Ghats, hiding in shaded areas beneath overhanging bamboo, cane or bushes.

See also 
 List of odonates of India
 List of odonata of Kerala

References

External links

Platycnemididae
Insects of India
Insects described in 1924
Taxa named by Frederic Charles Fraser